Thomas J. Lee (September 25, 1923 – November 7, 1996) is an American politician. Lee was elected to the 68th district of the Texas House of Representatives in 1965, and was the first Asian-American to serve in the Texas Legislature.

References

1923 births
1996 deaths
20th-century American politicians
Democratic Party members of the Texas House of Representatives